Monocorophium is a genus of amphipod crustaceans.

Species
The genus Monocorophium comprises the following species:
Monocorophium acherusicum (Costa, 1853)
Monocorophium californianum (Shoemaker, 1934)
Monocorophium carlottensis Bousfield & Hoover, 1997
Monocorophium cylindricum (Say, 1818)
Monocorophium insidiosum (Crawford, 1937)
Monocorophium josei Valério-Berardo & Thiago de Souza, 2009
Monocorophium oaklandense (Shoemaker, 1949)
Monocorophium sextonae (Crawford, 1937)
Monocorophium steinegeri (Gurjanova, 1951)
Monocorophium tuberculatum (Shoemaker, 1934)
Monocorophium uenoi (Stephensen, 1932)

Monocorophium acherusicum
Monocorophium acherusicum is a small (5 mm) species. It is brown with a very short abdomen, and has three little spines on its enlarged second antennae. It has rows of hair on its anterior legs, which it uses to filter food from the water. It naturally occurs in Europe, but was introduced to harbours of Australia by travelling in the ballast water of ships.

Monocorophium insidiosum
Monocorophium insidiosum builds tubes of mud and detritus on weeds, usually in brackish shallow subtidal waters, such as brackish lagoons, ditches and rivers. C. insidiosum occurs on American and European coasts from southern Baltic to eastern Mediterranean of North and South, and around Japan, and may grow up to 5 mm long.

Monocorophium sextonae
Monocorophium sextonae is 5 mm long and builds tubes of mud on algae, from shallow water up to 50 m deep. It occurs naturally in New Zealand, but was introduced into Plymouth, Devon in the 1930s. In the late 1970 it was introduced to Ireland, possibly by natural means from Devon. It can also be found along the European coast from southern Norway to the Mediterranean.

References

Corophiidea